Performance by an Actress in a Leading Role Selected by Viewers is one of the Hum Awards of Merit presented annually by the Hum Television Network and Entertainment Channel (HTNEC) to recognize an actress who has delivered an outstanding performance while working within the Television industry. Since its inception, however, the award has commonly been referred to as the hum for Best Actress or Best Drama Actress Viewers Choice. While actors are nominated for this award by Hum members who are actors and actresses themselves, winners are selected by Online Public Voting.

History
Hum Television Network and Entertainment Channel presented this award to one of the finest actresses of Pakistani TV industry. This Category is introduced at 2nd ceremony in order to select actress according to viewers choice.

Winners and nominees
In the list below, winners are listed first in the colored row, followed by the other nominees. Following the hum's practice, the dramas below are listed by year of their Pakistan qualifying run, which is usually (but not always) the drama's year of release.

For the first ceremony, the eligibility period spanned full calendar years. For example, the 1st Hum Awards presented on April 28, 2013, to recognized actors of dramas that were released between January, 2012, and December, 2012, the period of eligibility is the full previous calendar year from January 1 to December 31.

Date and the award ceremony shows that the 2010 is the period from 2010-2020 (10 years-decade), while the year above winners and nominees shows that the dramas year in which they were telecast, and the figure in bracket shows the ceremony number, for example; an award ceremony is held for the dramas of its previous year.

2010s

See also
 Hum Awards
 Hum Awards pre-show
 List of Hum Awards Ceremonies

References

External links
Official websites
 Hum Awards official website
 Hum Television Network and Entertainment Channel (HTNEC)
 Hum's Channel at YouTube (run by the Hum Television Network and Entertainment Channel)
 Hum Awards at Facebook (run by the Hum Television Network and Entertainment Channel)]

Hum Awards
Hum Award winners
Hum TV
Hum Network Limited
Awards for actresses